The Tornado outbreak of June 7–8, 1984 was a significant severe weather and tornado event that took place across the central United States from North Dakota to Kansas on June 7–8, 1984. The tornado outbreak produced several significant tornadoes including an F5 tornado which traveled through Barneveld, Wisconsin, in the early hours of June 8, 1984. The entire outbreak killed at least 13 people across three states including 9 in Barneveld alone.

Meteorological synopsis 

A low-pressure system entered the Midwestern United States on June 7, 1984, and intensified while bringing a surge of moist and humid air coming from the Gulf of Mexico. After most of the affected areas were hit by a mesoscale convective complex earlier during the morning of June 7, the unstable atmosphere, as well as wind shear and high CAPE values produced a favorable environment for the development of extensive severe weather with possible tornadoes. Starting at around mid-afternoon, it started to produce several tornadoes across southern Minnesota and northwestern and southern Iowa including three F3s and a long-track F4 which traveled over 130 miles from extreme northern Missouri to southwest of Iowa City. That tornado killed 3 people including one in Missouri's Harrison County. Another person was killed in Ringgold County in Iowa by an F2 tornado at around 9:00pm CDT. Activity continued through the overnight hours as a new cluster of storms developed across Wisconsin near the Iowa and Illinois borders and produced strong tornadoes including the Barneveld tornado up until the early morning hours of June 8, 1984, before dissipating.

Straight-line winds in excess of 100 mph and very large hail were also reported in eastern Iowa from the storm that went on to drop the tornado in Barneveld, Wisconsin.

Confirmed tornadoes

Barneveld–Black Earth, Wisconsin 

As the tornado activity calmed down across Iowa and Minnesota in which numerous strong to severe tornadoes struck those areas from mid-afternoon to mid-evening, the severe weather shifted east towards Wisconsin after dark where a tornado watch was issued at about 11:00pm CDT. By this time, most of the residents of Barneveld had gone to bed and were unaware of the tornado watch. A supercell thunderstorm, which affected portions of southeastern Iowa with a few tornadoes at around 9:00pm CDT before weakening and intensifying shortly after, entered Wisconsin from the Iowa/Illinois border at around 12:00am CDT near Dubuque. Shortly after 12:30am CDT, June 8, it produced its first tornado near Belmont in Lafayette County and lifted near Mineral Point in Iowa County about fifteen miles southwest of Barneveld.

A few minutes later, this storm system produced one of the few F5 tornadoes to hit Wisconsin, developing northeast of Mineral Point (five to six miles southwest of Barneveld). At 12:41 CDT this F5 tornado drove through the center of Barneveld in full force, finally dissipating in northern Dane County around 1:40am CDT after traveling 36 miles (57.9 kilometers) for 59 minutes. A strong lightning strike cut the electricity to the town just a few minutes before the tornado struck Barneveld, but it was followed by a deafening clap of thunder that awakened many residents. (It is said that the loss of power prevented the tornado siren from being activated prior to its arrival; in actuality, the town did not have a tornado siren that differed from the siren used to activate the town's volunteer fire and EMT squad. If the siren had been activated, the residents would not have known it was a tornado warning.) At its peak, the tornado was nearly a quarter-mile wide. Other tornadoes rated from F1 to F3 touched down from Columbia County to Dodge County until after 3:00am CDT when activity finally weakened.

The tornado was responsible for nine deaths and nearly 200 injuries in Barneveld while causing about $25 million in damage. In total, all three churches (the Congregational United Church of Christ, the Lutheran Church, and the Roman Catholic Church), 93 homes, 17 businesses out of the town's 18, including the library, municipal building, fire station, bank, and post office were destroyed.  The village's water tower, though damaged, was not toppled by the winds. In addition, 64 other homes were badly damaged. The F5 damage occurred at a cul-de-sac on the northeast side of town. A cluster of several newly built homes was completely swept away at this location. Trees were debarked and vehicles were thrown and mangled. Some of the debris including paperwork was later found about 135 miles away from the village. Eight homes were also destroyed in Black Earth, and 24 additional homes were destroyed between Barneveld and Black Earth. Other tornadoes in Wisconsin caused two additional injuries and about $15 million worth of damage but no additional fatalities.

The National Weather Service in Madison reported the next day that the frequency of lightning flashes in the storm visible from Madison exceeded 200 per minute, the flashes running together into a strobe-like effect, as mentioned in media reports and books about the disaster.

Historical perspective 

The Barneveld tornado was more particular as it was one of the rare tornadoes to occur during the overnight hours well after sunset although EF5/F5 tornadoes have occurred elsewhere during night, including more recently in Greensburg, Kansas, on May 4, 2007 as well as in Birmingham, Alabama, in April 1998, downtown Lubbock, Texas, in 1970, Tanner, Alabama, and Guin, Alabama, in 1974 and Udall, Kansas, in 1955, the last being the deadliest Kansas tornado ever with over 80 deaths.

The Barneveld tornado was the first F5 in Wisconsin since the 1958 Colfax tornado, which killed 21. It was the first F5 in the US since 2 April 1982 when one touched down near Broken Bow, Oklahoma; the next one occurred on 31 May 1985 in Wheatland, Pennsylvania, during the 1985 United States–Canada tornado outbreak. The Oakfield tornado of 18 July 1996, the most recent F5 in Wisconsin, did not cause any fatalities.

See also 
 List of North American tornadoes and tornado outbreaks
 List of F5 and EF5 tornadoes

References

External links 
 Summary of the Barneveld tornado and supercell (NWS Milwaukee)
 Analysis of the Barneveld Tornado (by Alex Harrington)

F5 tornadoes
Tornadoes of 1984
Tornadoes in Iowa
Tornadoes in Kansas
Tornadoes in Missouri
Tornadoes in Minnesota
Tornadoes in North Dakota
Tornadoes in South Dakota
Tornadoes in Wisconsin
Barneveld, Wisconsin Tornado Outbreak, 1984
June 1984 events in the United States